The Mladost Trophy is an annual international figure skating competition. It is typically held in March in Zagreb, Croatia. Medals may be awarded in the categories of men's singles, ladies' singles, and pair skating at the senior, junior, advanced novice, and lower levels. Senior level events were introduced in 2013.

Senior medalists

Men

Ladies

Junior medalists

Men

Ladies

Pairs

Advanced novice medalists

Men

Ladies

References

External links 
 Official site at the Croatian Skating Federation
 International Skating Union

Figure skating competitions
Figure skating in Croatia
International figure skating competitions hosted by Croatia